The Etihad City Football Academy, Melbourne is the training and administrative headquarters of professional football club Melbourne City FC. The club has been based at two of these facilities, originally at in the northern Melbourne suburb of Bundoora, and later at the Casey Fields sports precinct in Cranbourne East.

Bundoora site

City Football Group announced the construction of the facility in mid-2014, shortly after acquiring Melbourne Heart and renaming the club as Melbourne City. The site was situated within the La Trobe University precinct. Constructed in late 2014 for approximately $15 million Australian dollars, the City Football Academy has served as the Asia-Pacific base for the City Football Group company and since its opening in February 2015 has provided tenant club Melbourne City with some of the best facilities of any A-League club.

Among the facilities features are a world-class physiotherapy, sports rehabilitation and administrative building as well as a $2 million DESSO pitch, which is hybrid grass system where natural grassroots intertwine with artificial turf fibres and is able to withstand three times the wear of a normal pitch.

The facility was also the administrative and training hub of Melbourne City's youth team and its women's team. In December 2016, the club unveiled the Elite Women's Facility, an extension of the complex providing dedicated warm-up, training, locker and lecture rooms for the women's team.

Matildas base
On 16 May 2021 the Victorian Government announced a new "purpose-built home" for the Australia national women's soccer team (the "Matildas") would be constructed within the precinct prior to the 2023 FIFA Women's World Cup. The project is expected to cost $116 million, with the Federal government contributing $15 million, and the Victorian government allocating $101.5 million towards the project, alongside the $1.5 million that was spent on planning. The upgrades include a marquee pitch with grandstand seating; four other pitches (Hybrid, natural grass, synthetic), a futsal court, and high-performance facilities including a gymnasium and wet recovery area, medical and rehabilitation centre, meeting areas and player lounge.

This area will also incorporate the Victorian State Rugby centre, which will possess a show pitch with grandstand seating, two additional pitches, and high performance facilities including a gymnasium, sport science, medical and recovery areas and a training and match day home for the Melbourne Rebels’ Super W team.

Ultimately with these upgrades, the Victorian government intend to "reaffirm" Victoria's reputation as Australia's sporting capital. The pitch is expected to be utilized by the Matilda's for 140 days each year, with the pitch being used for 6000 hours annually by La Trobe University students for around 20 hours a week, grassroots clubs, and training for volunteers and administrators. These new upgrades are expected to encourage research collaboration between high-performance expects and academics at La Trobe University.

Etihad City Football Academy, Casey Fields
In December 2020, Melbourne City officials announced the club would move its training and administration facilities to Casey Fields in Melbourne's South-East. In 2019 the football facilities at Casey Fields included four floodlit pitches and a one-story administration building. The club announced that, in conjunction with the City of Casey, it would add an elite training tablet pitch, expand the size of the administration building to two storeys and leave space for potential future construction of a 4,000 capacity boutique stadium. The club's youth and women's teams began moving into the facility in early 2021, and the senior men's team commenced pre-season training later that year. Construction of the additional facilities commenced in July 2021 and will conclude in mid-2022.

See also
 Melbourne City Football Club
 City Football Group
 Etihad Campus (Manchester)
 City Football Academy (New York)
 City Football Academy (Montevideo)

References

External links

Melbourne City FC
Sports venues in Melbourne
La Trobe University
2015 establishments in Australia
Sports venues completed in 2015
Soccer venues in Melbourne
City